Anarsia nigricana is a moth of the family Gelechiidae. It was described by Kyu-Tek Park in 1991. It is found in Korea.

The larvae feed on Glycine max.

References

nigricana
Moths described in 1991
Moths of Korea